General elections were held in Mexico in 1888. Incumbent president Porfirio Díaz was re-elected with 99.7% of the vote.

Results

President

References

Mexico
General
Presidential elections in Mexico
Election and referendum articles with incomplete results